Salmo akairos is a species of trout, a salmonid fish, endemic to Lake Ifni, a lake less than one square kilometer in size located at an altitude of 2300 m in Morocco.

References

akairos
Lake fish of Africa
Fish described in 2005